Southwest Medical Center may refer to:

INTEGRIS Southwest Medical Center in Oklahoma City, Oklahoma
PeaceHealth Southwest Medical Center in Vancouver, Washington
Southwest Regional Medical Center in Little Rock, Arkansas
Memorial Hermann Southwest Hospital, also referred to as "Memorial Hermann Southwest Medical Center"
Southwest Medical Center in Liberal, Kansas